Sikkim Government College, Gyalshing is a co-educational degree College set up in 2011. It offers undergraduate courses in Arts and Social Sciences. It is located in the West District (District Headquarter) of Sikkim. The College is affiliated to Sikkim University.

The College Emblem

Gyana Vigyana Vimuktye is the motto of the college. It is a Sanskrit axiom extracted from Upanishad. ‘Gyana’ means knowledge, ‘Vigyana’ is higher and purer form of knowledge and ‘Vimuktye’ is emancipation.

Courses Offered

The college offers 13 honours subjects: English, Nepali, Bhutia, Lepcha, Limboo,  Geography, History, Political Science, Sociology, Economics, Physical Education, Education and Tourism. Besides, there are also compulsory papers like Compulsory English, Environmental Science and Eastern Himalayan Studies.

Academic Sessions
The Academic session of College is from July to December for Odd Semester and February to May for Even Semester.

References

External links
Official website

Universities and colleges in Sikkim
Colleges affiliated to Sikkim University